The Search for One-eye Jimmy is a 1994 comedy film written and directed by Sam Henry Kass.

Synopsis
Set in Brooklyn, New York, the movie is the story of a California film student Les (Holt McCallany) who returns to the town in which he grew up to shoot a film about it. The first individual he happens upon is Joe "Head" (so named because of the size of his head) played by Michael Badalucco. While interviewing him, they are told of a neighborhood man named "One-eyed" Jimmy (because of his glass eye) who has gone missing.

They then decide to switch gears from a documentary to a docu-drama, filming the hunt for Jimmy as they go. They come across one quirky character after another, each one giving his account of where Jimmy was last, or where he could be.

Jimmy's brother, played by Steve Buscemi, is not very interested in finding his brother. "Disco Bean", John Turturro's version of a disco-dancing freak stuck in an abandoned building dancing non-stop actually gives his account of how Jimmy lost his eye. "Colonel Ron", (Samuel L. Jackson), is a homeless, toothless, strange Vietnam veteran who catches fish in the Gowanus Canal, and  may actually be the most intelligent one in the bunch.

"Lefty" (Mancini) and "Junior" (Nick Turturro) constantly get into physical altercations because Junior, a kleptomaniac, is always stealing Lefty's car. The group uncover a ransom note but to meet the demands of the kidnappers they must borrow a large amount of money from the local loan shark "The Snake", played by Sirico, who thinks it is not worth the asking price to rescue Jimmy who he calls a "bum". Snake was formerly known as "The Whale" but has just returned from six months in a health spa where he lost two hundred lbs. and now wants to be known as "The Snake". The gang pays a visit to a psychic (Aida Turturro) in vain.

Completely distraught, Jimmy's mother (Anne Meara) commissions an amateur sketch artist Ellen (Jennifer Beals) to craft a poorly drawn portrait of Jimmy on a "missing person" flyer from a photograph, rather than using the actual photograph itself. Ultimately she decides she must throw a house party in Jimmy's honor, and invites the entire group of zany characters that we have met along the way. They all show up, and have a great time, and Joe Head woos Ellen as he displays dance moves passed on to him by Disco Bean.

Towards the end Jimmy winds up making his way home after his mother calls an early end to the party. He was trapped in the superintendent's apartment in the basement of his apartment house for five days, where he stayed alive by eating cat food. Visibly shaken, he recounts a tale of not having any beer to drink during his disappearance, and having to watch basic television channels since the super did not pay for cable. Jimmy vows that he will never do his laundry in the building again.

Les leaves, disappointed about the anticlimactic end to his story, but parts with Joe as friends. Later on, Joe and Junior, claiming they now own the rights after a financial dispute, are seen pitching the story to a Hollywood executive.

Cast
 Sam Rockwell as One-eye Jimmy Hoyt
 Steve Buscemi as Ed Hoyt
 John Turturro as Disco Bean
 Nicholas Turturro as Junior
 Aida Turturro as Madame Esther
 Anne Meara as Holly Hoyt
 Samuel L. Jackson as Colonel Ron
 Adam LeFevre as Detective
 Holt McCallany as Les
 Ray 'Boom Boom' Mancini as Lefty
 Jennifer Beals as Ellen
 Michael Badalucco as Joe Head 
 Tony Sirico as Whale/Snake
 Mallory Kass as Little girl

Screenings 
The Search for One-Eye Jimmy had a 25th Anniversary screening at The Art of Brooklyn Film Festival in June 2017. Director Sam Henry Kass was in attendance for the Q&A that followed.

References

External links
 IMDb page

1994 films
1994 comedy films
1996 comedy films
1996 films
1990s English-language films
American comedy films
1990s American films